Family First is a 2018 Canadian crime film directed by Sophie Dupuis.  The film premiered at the Rendez-vous du cinéma québécois. It is about a family in Verdun, Montreal, Quebec, including the protagonist JP (Jean-Simon Leduc), whose uncle Dany (Paul Ahmarani) leads a drug cartel. It was nominated for four Canadian Screen Awards, including Best Motion Picture, winning Best Actor for Théodore Pellerin.

Plot
In Verdun, Quebec, Dany runs an illegal drug cartel. His nephews, JP and the younger Vincent, who's 19, work in deliveries and "collections". JP and Vincent travel through Verdun to a Chinese restaurant possessing drugs on Dany's territory, harass the staff and empty the tills; they also intimidate others to coerce them to stop selling on the family territory. JP is dating Mel, who is alarmed about Vincent's erratic behavior, and she suggests to JP that Vincent needs help. Mel sleeps with JP at JP and Vincent's residence, where they live with their mother Joe; however, Mel tries to persuade JP to move in with her. Vincent frequently sleeps in his mother's bed.

Dany tells JP that he wants a woman, Chantal, killed. JP resists, but Dany harangues him for telling him how to run his business. Dany also warns JP that if JP does not take the job, he will enlist Vincent to do it. JP also becomes aware Dany has been sending a large number of text messages to Mel; Dany tells her via text that JP is a "fag" and she should leave him. JP and Dany break into Chantal's residence, but JP finds Chantal's children are present, and he pulls out with Vincent, leaving Chantal alive. Outside, JP tells Vincent their situation is spiraling out of control and that they should leave the cartel. Vincent disagrees, saying this is what they share. At the dinner table, Vincent also accuses Mel of wanting to leave them, and warns her not to take JP with her. Vincent says he is marries to his family, JP and Joe.

Dany is enraged that JP has failed to kill Chantal, and gives the job to Vincent. JP attempts to warn Chantal. Vincent attempts to ambush Chantal with a gun, but Chantal is accompanied by a man who is also armed. The man intimidates Vincent, forcing him to drop his gun. Dany visits Joe's residence to express his anger, but when he leaves he is gunned down.

Cast
Jean-Simon Leduc as JP
Théodore Pellerin as Vincent
Maude Guérin as Joe
Claude Laberge as Mel
Paul Ahmarani as Dany

Production
Family First was Dupuis' first feature film, with a total budget of $1.5 million. She received a $500,000 grant from the Cultural Enterprise Development Corporation for production. After a location scout in Montreal, Dupuis stated: "I chose Verdun because I didn't want to go over territory that was already so well-worn. I discovered Verdun when we were scouting. It was really born out of this desire to place this family in a village within a city".

Reception
, writing for La Presse, awarded Family First four stars, calling it a rare great debut for a Quebec director, proclaiming "Wow!" Le Soleils Éric Moreault assessed the film as a poignant exploration of the dysfunctional family, citing Dupuis' direction and Théodore Pellerin's performance. Le Devoir critic Odile Tremblay cited Pellerin and Maude Guérin for their acting.

Accolades
Family First received several nominations at the Prix Iris, including for Best Film. It was selected as the Canadian entry for the Best Foreign Language Film at the 91st Academy Awards, but it was not nominated.

See also
 List of submissions to the 91st Academy Awards for Best Foreign Language Film
 List of Canadian submissions for the Academy Award for Best Foreign Language Film

References

External links
 
 

2018 films
2018 crime drama films
Canadian crime drama films
Films about the illegal drug trade
Films set in Montreal
Films shot in Montreal
2010s French-language films
Films directed by Sophie Dupuis
French-language Canadian films
2010s Canadian films